Tribune East Tower is a  mixed use supertall tower to be constructed on the eastern edge of the Tribune Tower property, in the Streeterville area  of Chicago. The building plans were approved on  May 8, 2020. When completed, the tower will be the second-tallest building in Chicago, after the Willis Tower, and one of the tallest buildings in the Western Hemisphere.

History

Tribune Tower sits on the southwest corner of property that includes four buildings and a surface parking lot. The other buildings are (clockwise) the four-story 1935 WGN Radio building, the eleven-story 1950 WGN-TV building, and the old Chicago Tribune printing plant, with the parking lot immediately east of all of these buildings. The Tower itself was declared an official Chicago landmark by the city in 1989.

In early September 2016, prospective buyers of the Tribune Tower property had redevelopment plans for the adjacent Pioneer Court that were at odds with local interests to protect views of Tribune Tower. Nonetheless, later that month, Tribune Media sold Tribune Tower and adjacent property totaling , including the  surface parking lot, to the partnership. At the time of the purchase, the partnership of Los Angeles-based CIM Group and Chicago's Golub & Co. sought input on how to redevelop the properties, although 42nd District Alderman Brendan Reilly said that he would protect views of the Tower from the Michigan Avenue Bridge to the south and the Ogden Slip to the east.

By 2017, there were expectations that the partnership would plan a skyscraper tower to the east of Tribune Tower, though no plans had yet been made public. In January 2018, plans emerged for a skyscraper on the northern portion of the parking lot at the east side of the Tribune Tower property. Plans called for 220 hotel rooms and 158 condominium units; the tower would be slightly shorter than the Trump International Hotel and Tower. The new skyscraper was designed by Adrian Smith + Gordon Gill Architecture of Chicago. As an employee of Skidmore, Owings & Merrill, Adrian Smith had designed Trump Tower and the Burj Khalifa, which became the tallest building in the world in 2010.

The building will be  shorter than the Willis Tower, the city's tallest. The proposal outlined several details, including funding earmarked for affordable housing and neighborhood opportunity as well as plans for the rest of the Tribune Tower property. At the time it was proposed, the building had no official name, but it was referred to as Tribune East by the media. In mid-October 2018, the Chicago Plan Commission approved the plans for the city's second tallest building. Chicago City Council approved the plans in an October 31 meeting. Minor revisions were unveiled on November 20, 2019, and on May 8, 2020, the project received final approval. Construction has not yet started.

See also
List of tallest buildings in the United States

References

External links
Tribune East at Emporis
Tribune East Tower at SkyscraperPage

Central Chicago
Proposed buildings and structures in Illinois
Proposed skyscrapers in the United States